Jason Charles Beck (born 20 March 1972), professionally known as Chilly Gonzales, is a Canadian musician, songwriter, and producer. Currently based in Cologne, Germany, he previously lived for several years in Paris. Gonzales is a musical polymath, known for his rap albums, his collaborations with pop musicians like Feist and Drake, his albums of classical piano compositions (including the Solo Piano trilogy), and also for his collaborations with electronic musicians like Daft Punk and Boys Noize, the latter with whom he produces as Octave Minds.

Gonzales broadcasts a web series Pop Music Masterclass on WDR, the documentary Classical Connections on BBC Radio 1, The History of Music on Arte, and Music's Cool with Chilly Gonzales on Apple Music's Beats1 radio show. He has written several newspaper and magazine opinion pieces in The Guardian, Vice, Billboard, and others. He is the younger brother of film composer Christophe Beck. He has won several Grammy awards.

Biography

Early life and career 
Jason Charles Beck is the son of Ashkenazi Jews who were forced to flee from Hungary during World War II. He began teaching himself piano at age three, when his younger brother Chris began taking lessons. Beck graduated from Crescent School in Toronto, Canada. He was classically trained as a pianist at McGill University, where he began both his composing career, co-authoring several musicals with his brother, and his performing career, as a jazz pianist.

In the 1990s, he embarked on a pop career as the leader of the alternative rock band Son, with Dominic Salole and Dave Szigeti. Son was signed to a three-album deal with Warner Music Canada in 1995, a subsidiary of Warner Bros. Records. Their first release, the Prince/Elvis Costello-flavored LP Thriller, was moderately successful, spawning one single that received heavy radio airplay ("Pick up the Phone") and leading to several opening gigs for the Barenaked Ladies. The album's production values were limited; Warner Bros. simply released the band's hastily recorded demo.

Son's second release, Wolfstein, was recorded at a fully equipped studio in LA with the assistance of his brother Christophe. Nominally a concept album about a man who starts turning into a wolf after hitting one with his car, it features a darker, more complex sensibility than its predecessor.

To Warner Bros. the album represented too radical a change in direction, and lacked singles acceptable to the Canadian pop charts.; the most upbeat tune on the album had the radio-unfriendly title, "Making a Jew Cry". The label gave little promotional support to the release, and dropped the band soon after.

The Berlin years 

Finding dealing with the expectations of the Canadian music industry difficult, Gonzales moved to Berlin in 1999, despite speaking no German. He declared himself the President of the Berlin Underground and adopted the stage name Chilly Gonzales in 1999.

With this change in image came another major change in Gonzales's musical style. His four albums on the German label Kitty-yo (Gonzales Über Alles (1999), The Entertainist (2000), Presidential Suite (2002), and Z (2003)) were largely built around rap, though his skills as a keyboardist were demonstrated on a series of interspersed instrumental tracks. European critics and audiences were more receptive to the eclectic and experimental nature of Gonzales's output. His first Kitty-yo single, "Let's Groove Again", became a dance floor hit upon its 1999 release. It was used in a 2007 BBC promotional trailer for their new TV programme The Restaurant. Gonzales performed regularly at nightclubs and on the summer pop festival circuit.

Solo Piano, Chambers, and classical music 
In 2004, Gonzales released an album of instrumental material, Solo Piano. Praised by public and critics, it drew comparisons to the work of Erik Satie and so attracted a new global audience to his work.  Solo Piano remains Gonzales's best-selling album to date.

He followed it up nine years later with Solo Piano II, long-listed for the 2013 Polaris Music Prize.

In 2015, he released Chambers, a piano and chamber piece recorded with Hamburg's Kaiser Quartett, to generally positive reviews.

The trio of Solo Piano albums was completed with the release of Solo Piano III, on 7 September 2018.

Collaborations and songwriting 
In the meantime, Gonzales continued to develop as a producer and songwriter for other artists, collaborating on singles and albums with Peaches, singer Jane Birkin and indie rocker Leslie Feist. The output of the latter collaboration – Feist's 2003 album, Let It Die, became a bestseller, won critical acclaim and industry awards. Gonzales returned as a contributor on Feist's 2007 album, The Reminder, which was nominated for 4 Grammy Awards and won five Juno Awards.

Apart from his solo career, Gonzales is also a member of the Berlin-based hip-hop band Puppetmastaz.

Gonzales played in the songs "Give Life Back to Music" and "Within" on Daft Punk's fourth studio album, Random Access Memories, which won a Grammy Award for Album of the Year. In June 2013, his studio album Solo Piano II was longlisted for the 2013 Polaris Music Prize.

Gonzales collaborated with Jhené Aiko on the track "From Time" from Drake's third album Nothing Was the Same. They began linking up after Gonzales learned that Drake had used the entirety of Gonzales's song "The Tourist" as "Outro" on So Far Gone.

In 2016, Gonzales hosted Music's Cool, a 2-hour radio show on the Apple Music radio station Beats 1. In the show, he analysed the musical theory behind various artists, including past collaborators.

Soft Power and Ivory Tower 
In early 2008, Gonzales signed with Mercury Records, and on 7 April Soft Power was released.  While maintaining a typically eclectic mix of styles, Soft Power was basically a pop recording, with a sound reminiscent of the Bee Gees and Billy Joel. Gonzales chose to sing on the album.

Gonzales' album Ivory Tower (produced by Boys Noize) appeared on the !Earshot National Top 50 Chart in 2010. His song "Never Stop", from the album was one of his better known tunes, and the opening piano tune was featured on Apple Inc.'s worldwide advertising campaign for the iPad 2. Apple adapted the tune for electric guitar.

Grammy Award 
In 2014, Chilly Gonzales won an Album of the Year Grammy Award for his work on Daft Punk's "Random Access Memories".

Guinness World record 
On 18 May 2009, at the Ciné 13 Théâtre, Paris, he set a world record for the longest solo-artist performance with a total time of 27 hours, 3 minutes and 44 seconds, breaking a record set by Prasanna Gudi. He played over 300 songs.

Room 29 
On 17 March 2017 Gonzales released Room 29, a collaboration with Jarvis Cocker. The album is a song-cycle, and tells of happenings in one room at a Hollywood hotel. Gonzales and Cocker gave the first concert of the album on the day that it was released, in Hamburg, Germany at a concert hall named Kampnagel.

The Gonzervatory 
In 2018, Chilly Gonzales launched his own music school. Seven musicians from around the world joined him to study at The Gonzervatory, an 8-day all-expenses-paid residential music performance workshop in Paris. The workshop included coaching sessions with Gonzo, followed by masterclasses from Gonzales' friends and collaborators including Peaches, Socalled, Fred Wesley and Jarvis Cocker.  Evening rehearsals culminated in a finale concert at the Trianon Theater.

Discography
 Let's Groove Again – Single, 1999 (under the name "Gonzales")
 O.P. Original Prankster – (EP), 1999 (under the name "Gonzales")
 Gonzales Über Alles – Kitty-Yo, 2000 (under the name "Gonzales")
 The Entertainist – Kitty-Yo, 2000
 Presidential Suite – Kitty-Yo, 2002 (under the name "Gonzales")
 Z – Kitty-Yo, 2003 (under the name "Gonzales")
 Daft Punk – "Too Long" (from Daft Club) (2003)
 Solo Piano – No Format!, 2004 (under the name "Gonzales")
 Soft Power – Mercury/Universal, 2008 (under the name "Gonzales")
 Le Guinness World Record 'The Works', 2009
 You Can Dance – Gentle Threat, 2010
 The Unspeakable Chilly Gonzales – Gentle Threat, 2011
 Solo Piano II – Gentle Threat, 2012
 Daft Punk – "Within" (from Random Access Memories) – 2013
 Octave Minds (Chilly Gonzales and Boys Noize) – 2014
 Chambers – Gentle Threat, 2015
 Room 29 (Chilly Gonzales and Jarvis Cocker) – 2017
 Live at Massey Hall – Gentle Threat, 2018
 Other People's Pieces – Gentle Threat, 2018
 Solo Piano III – 2018
 A Very Chilly Christmas – 2020
 Consumed in Key (Plastikman & Chilly Gonzales) – 2022

DVD content
 From Major to Minor – 2006 – No Format!
 The Unspeakable Chilly Gonzales Live with Orchestra – May 2012 – Gentle Threat

Filmography

 Books 
In 2020, Gonzales wrote a book called Enya: A Treatise on Unguilty Pleasures.'' Gonzales uses his childhood appreciation for Enya as a metaphor for recognizing involuntary taste in music, rather than being affected by outside influences and social judgement.

References

External links
 Official Site
 Gonzales
 No Format!
 Epitonic: Gonzales
 Thought Catalog: Introducing Chilly Gonzales
 Gonzales in session at the Rob da Bank show
 Interview on the Jekyll and Hyde Show, 106FM Jerusalem
 
 

1972 births
20th-century Canadian rappers
21st-century Canadian male musicians
21st-century Canadian rappers
Arts & Crafts Productions artists
Canadian expatriates in France
Canadian expatriates in Germany
Canadian hip hop record producers
Canadian male pianists
Canadian male rappers
Canadian people of Hungarian-Jewish descent
Grammy Award winners
Jewish Canadian musicians
Jewish hip hop record producers
Jewish rappers
Kitty-Yo artists
Living people
McGill University School of Music alumni
Musicians from Montreal
Place of birth missing (living people)
20th-century Canadian male musicians